Kuang Haokun (born 8 February 1995) is a Chinese footballer.

Club career
Kuang made his professional senior debut in a 0–5 away loss to Kitchee on 8 January 2017. He replaced Zhong Ke in the 71st minute.

Career statistics

Club

Notes

References

1995 births
Living people
Chinese footballers
Association football defenders
Hong Kong Premier League players
Guangzhou F.C. players
R&F (Hong Kong) players
Chinese expatriate footballers
Expatriate footballers in Hong Kong
Footballers from Guangzhou
Chinese expatriate sportspeople in Hong Kong